The 2011 Breckland District Council election was part of the UK's 2011 local elections. All 54 seats were up for election. The Conservatives retained control of the council.

Summary of results

Breckland politics 2007–2011

In the approach to the 2011 election, the Conservative Party fielded far more candidates than their opponents, coming just short of a full slate. Candidates in All Saints, Mid Forest, Attleborough Queen's (3 councillors), and Templar wards stood unopposed, all of them for the Conservatives.

References

2011 English local elections
2011